Altiplania is a genus of moths of the family Noctuidae. The genus was erected by Paul Köhler in 1979.

Species
Altiplania inornata Köhler, 1979 Argentina (Mendoza)
Altiplania frayjorgensis Olivares & Angulo, 2015 Chile
Altiplania luetscheri Köhler, 1979 Argentina (Mendoza)
Altiplania maculata Köhler, 1979 Argentina (Mendoza)
Altiplania pizarroi Angulo & Olivares, 2005 Chile

References

Cuculliinae
Noctuoidea genera